Jack Andrew Leaning (born 18 October 1993) is an English first-class cricketer. A right-handed batsman and right arm off-spin bowler, Leaning joined Kent County Cricket Club at the end of the 2019 season, having previously played all of his professional cricket for Yorkshire after making his professional debut in 2012.

Leaning joined Yorkshire in 2008, starting at under 15 level. He went on to play for the Yorkshire Academy in the Yorkshire ECB County Premier League, and the Yorkshire Second XI in the Second XI Championship, before making his List A debut against Warwickshire in August 2012 and his first-class debut against Surrey in June 2013.  He became an established member of the Yorkshire side during the 2014 season.

In 2014, several York City F.C. fans sponsored Leaning in his first season as a full professional cricketer. His father Andy is a former player and goalkeeping coach of York.

In August 2019 it was announced that Leaning would join Kent County Cricket Club at the end of the 2019 English cricket season. In his second match for Kent he scored his maiden double-century, making 220 not out in a Kent record partnership for any wicket of 423 runs against Sussex at Canterbury in the 2020 Bob Willis Trophy. The innings was his first century for three seasons. In April 2022, he was bought by the Oval Invincibles for the 2022 season of The Hundred.

References

External links

1993 births
Living people
English cricketers
Yorkshire cricketers
Kent cricketers
Cricketers from Bristol
North v South cricketers